The 26th Kolkata International Film Festival took place from 8 to 15 January 2021. It was scheduled to take place from 5 to 12 November 2020 but was postponed to January 2021 due to COVID-19 pandemic in India.

Inauguration 
The 26th Kolkata International film festival was virtually inaugurated by CM of West Bengal Mamata Banerjee on 8 January 2020. Shah Rukh Khan, who is the brand ambassador of Bengal, joined the ceremony over a video call. Since 2011, Shah Rukh Khan has been attending the film festival each year.

Around 132 feature films, documentaries and short films have been selected to be showcased at the KIFF 2021 out of 1170 submissions. The festival commenced with actor Soumitra Chatterjee’s world-renowned film Apur Sansar.

Tributes 
The Festival Paid Tribute to Late Legendary Actor Shri Soumitra Chatterjee, Federico Fellini, Éric Rohmer, Ravi Shankar,  Fernando Solanas, Kim Ki-duk, Basu Chatterjee, Rishi Kapoor, Irrfan Khan, Tapas Paul, Amala Shankar, Hemanta Mukhopadhyay, Bhanu Bandopdhyay & Santu Mukhopadhyay.

Official Selection

Competition Categories

Asian Select (NETPAC Award)

Competition on Indian Language's Films

International Competition: Innovation in Moving Images

Competition on Indian Documentary Films

Competition on Indian Short Films

Non-Competition Categories

Bengali Panorama

Cinema International

Short & Documentary Panorama

Special Screening

Special Tributes

Centenary Tribute

Youth Day Celebration

Winners 

 Golden Royal Bengal Tiger Award for Best Film (Innovation in Moving Pictures): Bander Band - Manijeh Hekmat
 Golden Royal Bengal Tiger Award for Best Director  (Innovation in Moving Pictures) : Shambala -  Artykpai Suiundukov
 Golden Royal Bengal Tiger Award for Best Short: Dusk - Ujjwal Pal
 Golden Royal Bengal Tiger Award for Best Documentary - Highways of Life - Amar Maibam
 Special Jury mention (Innovation in Moving Pictures) : Blindfold - Taras Dron
 Hiralal Sen Memorial Award Best Film (Indian Languages) : False Eye (Kalla Nottam) - Rahul Riji Nair
 Hiralal Sen Memorial Award Best Director (Indian Languages) : God On the Belcony - Biswajit Bhora
 NETPAC Award for Best Film : NONAJOLER KABBO - Rezwan Shahriar Sumit

See also
 28th Kolkata International Film Festival

References

External links 
 

Kolkata International Film Festival
2020 film festivals
2020 festivals in Asia
2020 in Indian cinema